The 2014 FIA WTCC Race of Belgium was the seventh round of the 2014 World Touring Car Championship season and the fourth running of the FIA WTCC Race of Belgium after an absence of two seasons. It was held on 22 June 2014 at the Circuit de Spa-Francorchamps in Francorchamps, Belgium.

Both races were won by Citroën Total WTCC; Yvan Muller won race one from pole position and José María López won race two.

Background
López continued to lead the drivers' championship after the first six rounds, forty–one points ahead of teammate Yvan Muller. Franz Engstler held the lead of the Yokohama Trophy.

European Touring Car Cup racer Norbert Nagy joined Campos Racing for the Belgian round, driving a TC2 SEAT León WTCC.

Tiago Monteiro picked up a five–place grid penalty for the first race after colliding with Tom Chilton in race two at the FIA WTCC Race of Russia.

Report

Testing and free practice
López led a Citroën 1–2 in Friday testing, Monteiro was third for Honda.

López led a Citroën 1–2–3–4 in free practice one, Hugo Valente was best of the rest.

López was ahead of Valente in free practice two. The session saw a number of drivers lose lap times for exceeding track limits.

Qualifying
Muller was quickest in the first part of qualifying, López and Loeb were second and third. The fourth Citroën of Ma Qing Hua had balance issues and set a best time slower than his practice times and ended up 14th behind the Lada of Robert Huff.

The second session saw many of the cars running together in order to get a slipstream to assist them on the fast straights, Muller was second in the pack behind Michelisz and went fastest before López quickly knocked him down to second. Sébastien Loeb was third with Valente fourth and Gabriele Tarquini the last of the five cars to make it through to Q3. Gianni Morbidelli finished tenth and claimed pole position for race two.

In the Q3 shootout it was Muller who claimed pole ahead of Loeb and López, Valente lined up fourth ahead of Tarquini.

After qualifying, Dušan Borković had an engine change in his Chevrolet Cruze and was dropped to the back of the grid for race one.

Race One
Borković's Chevrolet sprung an oil leak on the grid after his engine change, with sand applied to his grid slot as a result. At the start the three Citroëns got away while Tarquini attacked Valente for fourth and Monteiro and Michelisz battles for sixth. Chilton did not get away at the start and the rest of the field went around the stranded Chevrolet before he got going. Valente went wide at La Source but got back as Tarquini dropped back towards Monteiro the midfield pack. Morbidelli passed the two factory Hondas and took fifth place. Huff spun out on the oil on the track at turn 12 and dropped to the back of the field. Both Valente and Mehdi Bennani were given drive–through penalties for exceeding track limits as López and Loeb battled for second place at the start of lap four which gave Muller a chance to distance himself from his title rivals. The windscreen on Ma's car broke on lap six as he battled for tenth position with Chilton and Borković, the screen had bent and distorted his vision. On the last lap López passed Loeb for second place at Les Combes while Monteiro was close up behind Morbidelli in pursuit of fourth place. Muller claimed a dominant win with López second and Loeb in third completing the Citroën 1–2–3, Monteiro made a last corner lunge on Morbidelli which allowed Tom Coronel to close in and take fifth place at the line. Franz Engstler was the winner in the TC2 category.

Race Two
Morbidelli from pole position was passed around the outside of La Source by Coronel at the start of the race. The two ran side–by–side up to Eau Rouge where Coronel came out on top and took the lead. Valente and López made contact at Malmedy sending the Campos Chevrolet into a half spin and allowing Muller to follow López through the gap. Monteiro got ahead of Morbidelli and into second place at the end of the first lap as Coronel led by a second. López gained another position on lap two when he passed Tarquini as he was lining up a pass on Michelisz at Rivage; López picked off Michelisz at the Bus Stop at the end of lap two and then Morbidelli at the same place the following lap. Ma went into the pits on lap five to retire after struggling in both races. At the start of lap six Coronel was under pressure for the lead from López, Muller was following him through the pack and was fourth behind Monteiro. Coronel defended but López drew alongside at La Source and made the pass at Eau Rouge to take the lead. Shortly after Muller passed Monteiro and then Coronel as he chased his title rival. López led a Citroën 1–2 with Muller second and Coronel held on to third place. Franz Engstler was the TC2 winner once again.

Results

Qualifying

Bold denotes Pole position for second race.

Race 1

Bold denotes Fastest lap.

Race 2

Bold denotes Fastest lap.

Standings after the event

Drivers' Championship standings

Yokohama Trophy standings

Manufacturers' Championship standings

 Note: Only the top five positions are included for both sets of drivers' standings.

References

External links
World Touring Car Championship official website

Belgium
FIA WTCC Race of Belgium
FIA WTCC Race of Belgium
Circuit de Spa-Francorchamps